Michel (Michael) Heine (19 April 1819 – 10 November 1904) was a French banker and businessman. Through his daughter, Alice, he was the father-in-law of Albert I, Prince of Monaco

References

External links 
 Genealogy of the Heine family (in French)

1819 births
1904 deaths
19th-century French Jews
French bankers
Regents of the Banque de France
19th-century French businesspeople
Businesspeople from Bordeaux